Keskinarkaus is a surname. Notable people with the surname include:

Matti Keskinarkaus (born 1976), Finnish orienteer
Mikko Keskinarkaus (born 1979), Finnish skier
Seppo Keskinarkaus (born 1949), Finnish orienteer